Cnidoscolus stimulosus, the bull nettle, spurge nettle, tread-softly or finger rot, is a perennial herb covered with stinging hairs, native to southeastern North America. A member of the family Euphorbiaceae (spurge family), it is not a true nettle. It prefers sandy, well-drained soil and mostly exists in pine/blackjack oak forests on sandhills, rims of Carolina bays, dunes, dry pastures, fields and roadsides.

Description
The green leaves of this plant are alternate, consisting of three to five untoothed lobes. The large, white flowers have five petals. Male and female flowers are on different plants. Flowers occur throughout the spring and summer followed by a small capsule that produces three large seeds. The entire plant above ground, including the flower petals, is covered with stinging hairs. The tap root can be used as an excellent potato substitute, tasting like pasta.

As the common names imply, the urticating hairs on this plant contain a caustic irritant that inflicts a painful sting to those who contact it with bare skin. It can cause a painful, irritating rash and can cause more serious reactions with some people.

Etymology and names
The species name stimulosus comes from the Latin stimulus, meaning "goad" or "prod". This plant is also known as bull nettle and mala mujer (Spanish for "bad woman" or witch), though the latter name is applied to several other plants with similar properties.

References

External links
 Cnidolscolus stimulosus at Alabamaweeds.com
 Wildflowers of the Escambia
 Cnidoscolus stimulosus at Itis.gov

stimulosus